The Agilolfings were a noble family that ruled the Duchy of Bavaria on behalf of their Merovingian suzerains from about 550 until 788.  A cadet branch of the Agilolfings also ruled the Kingdom of the Lombards intermittently from 616 to 712.
They are mentioned as the leading dynasty in the  Lex Baiuvariorum (c. 743). Their Bavarian residence was at Regensburg.

The dynasty's eponymous ancestor is  Agilulf, a semi-legendary prince of the Suebi and descendant of Hermeric, the 5th-century Suevic king of Galicia, possibly identical with one Agilulf, a steward of the Visigothic king Theoderic II, who was executed in 457.

The first duke identified with the Agilolfing line in German historiography is  Garibald I (Gariwald). 
However, doubt has been cast on Garibald's membership in the Agilolfing family in modern scholarship, which makes Tassilo I (r. 591–610) the first ascertained member of the dynasty.

The Agilolfings had close ties to the Merovingians. Garibald I himself married Waldrada, the widow of Merovingian king Theudebald, in 555, after her marriage to Chlothar I was annulled on grounds of consanguinity.
As they had their fate intertwined with the Merovingian dynasty, they opposed the rise of the Carolingian mayors of the palace, who finally deprived the Agilolfings of their power.

Rulers of Bavaria
Garibald I, Duke of Bavaria 548–591
Tassilo I, King of Bavaria 591–610
Garibald II, Duke of Bavaria 610–630
Theodo, Duke of Bavaria 680–716
Lantpert, son of Theodo, murderer of Emmeram of Regensburg
Uta, daughter of Theodo
Theodbert, son of Theodo, Duke in Salzburg ca. 702–719
Theobald, son of Theodo, Duke of parts of Bavaria ca. 711–719
Tassilo II, son of Theodo, Duke in Passau ca. 716–719
Grimoald, son of Theodo,  Duke in Freising ca. 716–725, later ruling all of Bavaria
Hugbert, son of Theudbert, Duke of Bavaria 725–737
Odilo, son of Gotfried of Allemania, Duke of Bavaria 737–748
Grifo, 748 (half-Carolingian usurper)
Tassilo III, son of Odilo, Duke of Bavaria 748–788, deposed by Charlemagne
Theodo, son of Tassilo III, became a monk

Rulers of Italy

Gundoald, Duke of Asti, son of Garibald I
Theodelinda, daughter of Garibald I of Bavaria, Queen of the Lombards
Adaloald, son of Theodelinda and Agilulf, King of the Lombards 616 to 626
Gundeberga, daughter of Agilulf and Theodelinda, married King Arioald
Aripert I, son of Gundoald, King of the Lombards 653–661
Godepert, eldest son of Aripert, King of the Lombards 661–662 jointly with
Berthari, younger son of Aripert, King of the Lombards 661–662 and 672–688
Cunincpert, son of Berthari, King of the Lombards 688–700
Liutpert, son of Cunincpert, King of the Lombards 700–701
Raginpert, son of Godepert, King of the Lombards 701
Aripert II, son of Raginpert, King of the Lombards 701–712

At the Austrasian court
Chrodoald, nobleman at the court of Dagobert I, killed in 624
Fara, opponent to Sigebert III

References

Further reading

External links
Biographies of some Agilolfingians
Tentative Genealogy of Early Agilolfings, according to Jörg Jarnut

 
Duchy of Bavaria
Lombard families
Merovingian period
Baiuvarii